Mario Belcon (born 2 November 1986) is a Trinidadian cricketer. He played in three first-class and five List A matches for Trinidad and Tobago in 2006 and 2007.

See also
 List of Trinidadian representative cricketers

References

External links
 

1986 births
Living people
Trinidad and Tobago cricketers